The Neijing Tu is a Daoist "inner landscape" diagram of the human body illustrating Neidan , Wu Xing, Yin and Yang, and Chinese mythology.

Title
The name Neijing tu combines nei 內 "inside; inner; internal", jing 經 "warp (vs. woof); scripture, canon, classic; (TCM) meridian; channel", and tu 圖 "picture; drawing; chart; map; plan". This title, comparable with Huangdi Neijing 黃帝內經 "Yellow Emperor's Inner Canon", is generally interpreted as a "chart" or "diagram" of "inner" "meridians" or "channels" for circulating qi in neidan practices.

English translations of Neijing tu include:
"Diagram of the Internal Texture of Man" (Needham 1983:114)
"Diagram of the Inner Scripture" (Ching 1997:188)
"Chart of Inner Passageways" (Despeux and Kohn 2003:184)
"Diagram of Internal Pathways" (Komjathy 2004:40)
"Chart of the Inner Warp" or "Chart of the Inner Landscape" (Despeux 2008:767)

Neijing tu 內經圖 has an alternate writing of Neijing tu 內景圖 "Diagram of Interior Lights" (Kohn 2000:499, 521), using jing 景 "view; scenery; condition" as a variant Chinese character for jing 經.

History
While the original Neijing tu provenance is unclear, it probably dates from the 19th century (Komjathy 2004:11). All received copies derive from an engraved stele dated 1886 in Beijing's White Cloud Temple 白雲觀 that records how Liu Chengyin 柳誠印 based it on an old silk scroll discovered in a library on Mount Song (in Henan). In addition, a Qing Dynasty colored scroll Neijing tu was painted at the Ruyi Guan 如意館 "Palace of Fulfilled Wishes" library in the Forbidden City (Despeux 2008:767).

The Neijing Tu was the precursor for the Xiuzhen Tu 修真圖 "Cultivating Perfection Diagram". The earliest anatomical diagrams with Daoist Neidan symbolism are attributed to Yanluozi 煙蘿子 (fl. 10th century) and conserved in the 1250 CE Xiuzhen shishu 修真十書 "Cultivating Perfection Ten Books" (Kohn 2000:521).

Contents

The Neijing tu laterally depicts a human body (resembling either meditator or fetus) as a microcosm of nature – an "inner landscape" (Schipper 1993:100–112) with mountains, rivers, paths, forests, and stars. Joseph Needham (1983:114) coins the term "microsomography" and describes the Neijing tu as "much more fanciful and poetical" than previous Daoist illustrations.

The textual descriptions include names of zangfu organs, two poems attributed to Lü Dongbin 呂洞賓 (born ca. 798 CE, one of the Eight Immortals), and quotations from the Huangting jing 黃庭經 "Yellow Court Scripture".

The Neijing image of a mountain with crags on the skull and spinal column elaborates upon the "body-as-mountain" metaphor, first recorded in 1227 CE (Despeux and Kohn 2003:185). The head shows Kunlun Mountains, upper dantian "cinnabar field", Laozi, Bodhidharma, and two circles for the eyes (labelled "sun" and "moon"). The flanking poem explains.
 The white-headed old man's eyebrows hang down to earth; 
The blue-eyed foreign monk's arms support heaven. 
If you aspire to this mysticism; 
You will acquire its secret. (tr. Wang 1992:145) 
Chinese constellations figure prominently. The heart depicts Niulang 牛郎 "the cowherd" "Altair" holding the Beidou 北斗 "Northern Dipper" "Big Dipper". Together with his archetypal lover Zhinü 織女 "the weaver girl" "Vega" (see Qi Xi), they propel qi up to the tracheal Twelve-Storied Pagoda. The liver and gall bladder are a forest, the stomach is a granary, and the intestines caption reads "the iron ox ploughs the field where coins of gold are sown" (tr. Needham 1983:116) referring to the Elixir of life. At base of the spine are treadmill waterwheels (an early Chinese invention) being run by two children representing yin and yang.

See also
 Xiuzhen Tu
 Meridian (Chinese medicine)
 Nadi (yoga)
 Microcosm–macrocosm analogy

References
Ching, Julia. 1997. Mysticism and Kingship in China: The Heart of Chinese Wisdom. Cambridge University Press.
Despeux, Catherine. 2008. "Neijing tu and Xiuzhen tu", in The Encyclopedia of Taoism, ed. Fabrizio Pregadio, Routledge, 767–771.
Despeux, Catherine and Livia Kohn. 2003. Women in Daoism. Three Pines Press.
Needham, Joseph. 1983. Science and Civilisation in China: Volume 5, Chemistry and Chemical Technology; Part 5, Spagyrical Discovery and Invention: Physiological Alchemy. Cambridge University Press.
Kohn, Livia, ed. 2000. Daoism Handbook. Brill.
Komjathy, Louis. 2004. Daoist Texts in Translation (Internet Archive copy).
Schipper, Kristofer M. 1993. The Taoist Body. University of California Press.
Wang, David Teh-Yu. 1992. "Nei Jing Tu, a Daoist Diagram of the Internal Circulation of Man," The Journal of the Walters Art Gallery 49–50:141–158.

External links
Diagram of the Inner Channels (Neiching T'u) translation of the text (Internet Archive copy) 
內經圖, Bilingual (Chinese-English) text of Neijing tu with word-by-word translation and transcription (7 MB PDF file)
內經圖, Neijing tu image (obsolete link)
內經圖, Neijing tu color image
氣功與內經圖, Qigong and Neijing tu 
Neijing Tu, clickable image details, The Art Institute of Chicago
Explanation of the Inner Alchemy Chart, Universal Tao Center
Inner Landscape of Human's Body/Nei Jing Tu, DaMo Qigong
Neijing tu (Chart of the Inner Warp), from the Golden Elixir website

Chinese culture
Chinese words and phrases
Qigong
Taoist art
Taoist texts